The 13425 / 13426 Surat–Malda Town Express is an Express train running between  of Gujarat and  of West Bengal.

It operates as train number 13425 from Malda Town to Surat and as train number 13426 in the reverse direction, serving the states of Gujarat, Maharashtra, Chhattisgarh, Odisha, Jharkhand and West Bengal.

Coach composite 

The train consists of 22 coaches:

 1 AC II Tier
 5 AC III Tier
 8 Sleeper class
 6 General Unreserved
 2 Seating cum Luggage Rake

Services

13425 Malda Town–Surat Express covers the distance of 2137 km in 40 hours 20 mins (53 km/hr) & in 41 hours 40 mins as 13426 Surat–Malda Town Express (51 km/hr).

As the average speed of the train is below , as per Indian Railway rules, its fare doesn't include a Superfast surcharge.

Route & Halts 

The important halts of the train are:

Reversals 

Rake sharing

The train shares its rake with 13417/13418 Digha–Malda Town Express.

Traction 

The route is fully electrified, both trains are hauled by a Howrah Loco Shed-based WAP-4 locomotive from end to end.

See also

 Tapti Ganga Express
 Shramik Express
 Udyog Karmi Express

References

Express trains in India
Rail transport in Bihar
Rail transport in Gujarat
Transport in Surat
Transport in Maldah
Rail transport in West Bengal